Frederick Wayne (1834–1901) was a 19th-century Member of Parliament in Otago, New Zealand.

Wayne married in 1864 and had four sons.

References

1834 births
1901 deaths
Members of the New Zealand House of Representatives
New Zealand MPs for South Island electorates
19th-century New Zealand politicians